Archbishop Alter High School, also known as Alter High School, is a Catholic high school in Kettering, Ohio, United States. It is operated by the Roman Catholic Archdiocese of Cincinnati and is named after Archbishop Karl Joseph Alter.

History

In October 1958, Catholics of the Dayton area pledged $4,953,050 to help pay the costs of building Catholic high schools in the area. Among the schools built with this money were Archbishop Alter High School and its mirror image, Carroll High School, built the previous year. Development of Alter High School was led by Reverend Paul F. Leibold, and, at the request of the people, the school was named after Archbishop Karl Alter. Archbishop Karl Alter was born on August 18, 1885, and died on August 23, 1977.

The school saw its first students on September 5, 1962, with an incoming class of 250 freshmen. In each of the next three years a new freshman class would be added, so, by the year 1965, the school offered grades 9 through 12, with the first class graduating in 1966.

Alter High's first principal was Reverend Edward F. Haskamp, serving from 1962 to 1970.  In 2005, Alter High named Fr. James Manning, former pastor of St. Albert the Great Parish in Kettering, as its first President.

Faculty
Alter High School's faculty is composed of diocesan priests of the Archdiocese of Cincinnati, Sisters of Charity of Mount St. Joseph, and lay teachers.

Academics
Alter features a strong STEM Curriculum through a partnership with Project Lead the Way.  Alter has earned a Governor's Award for STEM education and has added 6 new labs to the school since 2009.  20 Students participated in the State Science Fair and 4 earned perfect scores in 2014.  Every student at Alter is now equipped with a laptop computer complete with Microsoft Office software.  The OGT pass rate at Alter is 100%.

The school provides AP classes, which offer the prospect of college credit as well as a weighted grade. Alter students have already proven to consistently exceed state and national test averages due, in part, to the supplemental course offerings they can take, in addition to the ample amounts of study halls offered. Alter graduates commonly attend the University of Cincinnati, University of Dayton, Wright State University, Miami University (Ohio), Ohio State University, and Ohio University.

The Taylor College Lab at Alter was provided by a generous donation and operated by Sinclair College, it offers students a way to take classes for college credit and remain on Alter's campus.  Students may use this facility to take practice exams for ACT, SAT and other academic tests.  They may also work on college résumés and applications in the lab and along with the guidance office was responsible for the $15,500,000 full and partial academic, athletic and arts scholarships generated by the Class of 2014.

A student's school day begins at 8:00 AM and ends at 3:05 PM and the schedule was changed for the 2009–2010 school year to include eight 46-minute class periods and a 25-minute lunch period, with three minutes between each period to change classes. This change has allowed the students more flexibility with choosing electives or study halls within their schedules.

Performing arts at Alter

Alter prides itself that the opportunities it provides to its students are not exclusively academic and athletic - the school offers a number of opportunities in the creative and performing arts. Alter is currently raising money to add an Arts Wing to the school to help the Arts program grow.

Bands
Alter students can choose to participate in multiple ensembles during the year: the Marching Knights, Jazz Band, Pep Band, Wind Ensemble, String Ensemble, Woodwind and Brass Ensembles, Winter Guard and Winter Drumline. The music department has been under the direction of Todd Tucker since 2007.

The Marching Knights are the musical ambassadors for Archbishop Alter High School. In addition to their musical support and performances at football games, the band also appears at festivals and in parades in the community. Competitively,The Marching Knights perform on the Mid States Band Association (MSBA) circuit regionally, which includes bands from Ohio, Indiana, Kentucky and Michigan, and the Bands of America (BOA) circuit nationally. The band has been an MSBA Class Champion 9 times since 2012, including a 6-year run from 2012-2017, and in 2022 the Marching Knights captured their first BOA Grand National Class A Championship in Indianapolis. 

The Marching Knights typically field a membership of 35 students, but see success on the national scale despite their size. The band has been a BOA Regional Finalist by score at multiple competitions since 2012, and in 2016 won Class A at the BOA St. Louis Super Regional, notching their first Class A win at any BOA competition. Due to their performance at the 2013 Atlanta BOA Super Regional, the group was asked by Winter Guard International (WGI) to be one of 3 groups to help pilot their new division, WGI Winds, in the spring of 2014 by performing in exhibition at two WGI regional competitions. 

Since 2009, the band has made annual trips to the BOA Grand National Championships in Indianapolis (excepting 2020, due to the COVID-19 Pandemic), and have seen increased success during that span. The Knights first broke into Grand National Semi-Finals in 2013 (i.e., were in the top four Class A bands), marking the first of 4 appearances over the next 5 years, and 6 appearances over the next 10. In 2014 and 2016, the Marching Knights found the podium in addition to their Semi-Finals appearance, where they finished 3rd in both years. In 2021, at Grand Nationals, the band returned to Semi-Finals for the first time since 2017, finished 2nd, and won the Class A Visual caption, marking both their highest placement to date and their first caption win at Nationals. 

In 2022, the Marching Knights won Class A at the Bands of America Grand National Championships with their show "Overjoyed", which featured the music of Stevie Wonder. During their preliminary performance, the band scored an 81.500 and finished 37th, marking their highest overall finish at Grand Nationals. Their score of 79.400 in Semi-Finals is their highest final-show score at Grand Nationals.

Band shows

*Semi-Finals Appearance

Winter Guard shows:
2014 Seize the Day
2015 Music Box
2016 It Gets Better
2017 Rise to Power
2018 The Original Imagineer
2019 Workin' it Out!
WGI Winds
2014 Magic Show (as exhibition)
2015 fiVe
2016-Present: Did not compete

Theatre
In the late 1990s and early 2000s, Alter's theatre program grew into its own department with additional classes and very impressive productions. Several shows since 2001 have brought first and second place state awards in categories
of Group Musical, Solo, Lighting, Sound, Design, Duet and Playwrighting, including How to Succeed in Business without
Really Trying, Teahouse of the August Moon, Anything Goes and Cabaret. Alter has gained acclaim within the Miami Valley for excellence in arts education. This due to strong support from the community and administration and a tradition of excellence over the years by theatre directors Bob Heman, Trace Crawford, Bryan Wallingford, Katie Arber, and (currently) Megan Wean-Sears. The school's Theatre department has produced many stellar productions (see list below). Another unique facet of the program is Alter's Thespian Troupe (#5802), a chapter of an international organization dedicated to the celebration of achievement in theatre arts education. Alter proudly takes place in many thespian-related activities.

Past productions
2021-22 - The Play that Goes Wrong, The Lightning Thief, Newsies
2019-20 - 26 Pebbles, Freaky Friday, Once on This Island
2018-19 - The Guys, Steel Magnolias, Songs for a New World, Thoroughly Modern Millie
2017-18 - Lost in Yonkers, Godspell
2016-17 - And Then They Came for Me, The Drowsy Chaperone
2015-16 - Blithe Spirit, Aida
2014-15 - The Musical Comedy Murders of 1940, Into the Woods
2013-14 - Boeing-Boeing, Children of Eden
2012-13 - The Bad Seed, Beauty and the Beast
2011-12 - Willy Wonka & the Chocolate Factory, Bye Bye Birdie
2010-11 - The Snow Queen, Oklahoma!
2009-10 - Once Upon a Pandora's Box, Cinderella
2008-09 - Miss Nelson Is Missing!, Grease
2007-08 - Inspecting Carol, Thoroughly Modern Millie
2006-07 - Romeo and Juliet, Little Shop of Horrors
2005-06 - Arsenic and Old Lace, Seussical
2004-05 - Epic Proportions, Godspell
2003-04 - The Odd Couple, How to Succeed in Business Without Really Trying
2002-03 - The Teahouse of the August Moon, 42nd Street
2001-02 - The Witching Hour, Anything Goes
2000-01 - The Rivals, Into the Woods
1999-2000 - The Visit, Will Rogers Follies
1998-99 - Don't Drink the Water, Guys and Dolls
1997-98 - The Musical Comedy Murders of 1940, Little Shop of Horrors
1977-78 - Oliver

Clubs and activities
The school's Latin Club functions as a local chapter of both the Ohio Junior Classical League (OJCL) and the National Junior Classical League (NJCL).

Sports

Archbishop Alter High School's team nickname is the Knights; their colors are brown and gold.  In general, both the boys' and girls' teams belong to the GCL-CoEd (Greater Catholic League).

Home basketball and volleyball games are played in the school gym. The school also owns a soccer field encircled by a track, where the soccer team plays its home games and the track and field team practices. Although they have a four lane track, Alter High School does not own a football field, so home football games are typically held at other local high schools such as Fairmont High School or Centerville High School. The head football coach is Ed Domsitz and he has led the Alter Knights to 5 final four state championship appearances, including two back-to-back state championships in 2008 and 2009.

Ohio High School Athletic Association state championships

 Boys' Football - 2008, 2009
 Boys' Basketball - 1978, 1999, 2001
 Boys' Cross Country - 1996
 Boys' Golf - 1992, 1993, 1998, 1999, 2022
 Boys' Soccer - 1987, 1988, 1996, 1998, 2016
 Girls' Soccer - 2016, 2019
 Girls' Volleyball - 2002, 2003, 2006
 Girls' Basketball - 2008, 2015 (completed a perfect 30-0 2014-2015 season), 2016, 2017, 2022
 Girls' Cross Country- 2007

Other athletic accomplishments
 Boys' Tennis - team state champs 1976*
 Girls' Tennis - team state champs 2001*
 Boys Volleyball - team state champs 2011, 2012, 2014, 2015, 2016, 2017*
 *Note - The OHSAA does not hold team state championship tournaments for tennis or boys volleyball. Rather, they are administered by the state coaches' association of their respective sports.

Boys' sports
A full listing of the boys' sports offered at Alter High School:

Golf
Soccer
Football
Cross Country
Basketball
Bowling
Swimming & Diving
Wrestling
Tennis
Ice Hockey
Lacrosse
Baseball
Track & Field
Volleyball

Girls' sports
A full listing of the girls' sports offered at Alter High School:

Cheerleading
Soccer
Cross Country
Golf
Volleyball
Tennis
Basketball
Bowling
Gymnastics
Swimming & Diving
Softball
Track & Field

Rivalries
Alter High has a number of sports rivals. Depending on the sport, the school's biggest games each year are against local public school rivals Kettering Fairmont High School (Ohio) or Centerville High School. Chaminade-Julienne High School, Bishop Fenwick High School (Franklin, Ohio) and Carroll High School are the three local Catholic School rivals. Alter has won 10 GCL All-Sports Trophies in a row.

Spirit
Alter High School is marked by the school spirit of its students. Every Friday is Spirit Day, on which students are allowed to wear a spirit shirt of the school colors along with the standard uniform pants. Sporting events, especially football and basketball games, are well-attended by students. A tradition of dress up "themes" for each of the home football games has developed as a fun display of school spirit. Past themes include "Knight Night" and "Alter Teacher Night." The theme of the homecoming game is always "Toga Night." Pep rallies are common on the days of rivalry games.

Alma mater
The alma mater is played by the school band at the end of every pep rally and on various other occasions. While it is played, students extend their arms over the shoulders and neck of those to their left and right and sway together with the music. When the lyrics reach "High in Hope and Spirit," the student unjoin and proceed to raise and lower their right arms, index finger extended as if pointing, holding the position at the end of each line until the song ends. The Alma Mater was written by one of the first nuns to teach at the school.

Fight song
Although not as common as the Alma Mater, Alter High School also has a fight song. This may be sung on occasions such as a team bus ride to a sporting event or after a victory, but is most commonly sung on the bus after a football victory. After the game, the team will go over to the student section and sing the fight song. The Fight Song was written by one of the first nuns to teach at Alter.

Notable alumni
Connor Bazelak - football player (NCAA)
Chris Borland - football player (NFL)
David Bradley - inventor of the Control-Alt-Delete keyboard combination
Megan Courtney - volleyball player 
Amy Ferguson - actress
Jeff Graham - football player (NFL)
Timothy Keating - retired Admiral, United States Navy
Randy Leen - low amateur, 1996 U.S. Open
Holley Mangold - Olympic weightlifter
Nick Mangold - football player, New York Jets (NFL)
Steve Martino - director (Ice Age: Continental Drift and Horton Hears a Who!)
Jim Paxson - basketball player and general manager (NBA)
John Paxson - basketball player and general manager (NBA)
Jeff Reboulet - baseball player (MLB)
Madeline Rogero - first female mayor of Knoxville, Tennessee
Stephen Scaia - producer, writer
Joe Thuney - football player, Kansas City Chiefs (NFL)
Malik Zaire - football player (NCAA)

References

External links
 Archbishop Alter High School
 Alter High Schools Girls Volleyball Homepage

High schools in Montgomery County, Ohio
Catholic secondary schools in Ohio
Educational institutions established in 1962
Roman Catholic Archdiocese of Cincinnati
Kettering, Ohio
1962 establishments in Ohio